Terra 2001 is the second album of The Brilliant Green released on September 8, 1999.

Track listing

References 

2001 albums
The Brilliant Green albums